W. Yvon Dumont,  (born January 21, 1951) is a Manitoba politician and office-holder.  In 1993, he became the first member of Manitoba's Métis community to be appointed as the province's 21st Lieutenant Governor. He was born in St. Laurent, Manitoba.

He became involved in the Manitoba Metis Federation in 1967, and became its Director for the Interlake region in 1972.  He was chosen Executive Vice-President of the Federation in 1973, and served as its President from 1984 to 1993.

Dumont was also a founding member of the Native Council of Canada in 1972, and served as President of the Métis National Council from 1988 to 1993.  He has participated as a representative of the MMF at Canadian First Ministers' conference, and has been actively involved in constitutional debates concerning First Nations and Métis peoples.  Dumont has rejected the integration of Métis services into larger Indigenous institutions, expressing concern that Métis distinctiveness could be lost.

Dumont has also been a municipal councillor in St. Laurent, and was on the Board of Governors for the University of Manitoba. He received a Manitoba Metis Federation Award in 1993, and a National Aboriginal Achievement Award, now the Indspire Awards, in 1996.

Dumont's appointment as Lt. Governor of Manitoba coincided with a national reappraisal of Métis leader Louis Riel's role in the province's creation.  Once regarded as a rebel and an outlaw, Riel has in recent years been accepted as a Father of Confederation for his role in establishing a provisional government in the Red River Colony.  The appointment of Dumont as Lt. Governor undoubtedly reflected this changed perspective.

The position of Lt. Governor is largely ceremonial, and Dumont had very little influence over the Progressive Conservative government of Gary Filmon.

Dumont was appointed to the Order of Manitoba in 2001.  He ran again for the leadership of the MMF in 2003, but was defeated by David Chartrand.

Arms

References
 Lt. Governor of Manitoba Official biography

1951 births
Living people
Lieutenant Governors of Manitoba
Members of the Order of Manitoba
Métis politicians
Indspire Awards
Canadian Métis people